Kiran Kumar Sah is a Nepalese politician, currently serving as the member of the 2nd Federal Parliament of Nepal. In the 2022 Nepalese general election, he won the election from Rautahat 2 (constituency).

References

Living people
Nepal MPs 2022–present
1977 births